CCGS Corporal Teather, C.V. is the third of nine of the Canadian Coast Guard's . Constructed in 2013, the ship entered service the same year. Corporal Teather C.V.  is based in Dartmouth, Nova Scotia, tasked with fisheries patrol and enforcement.

Description
The patrol vessel is also equipped with two Northern Lights M1066 generators and one Northern Lights M1064 emergency generator. The ship has a complement of nine with five officers and four crew and has five additional berths. The ship is equipped with Sperry Marine Visionmaster FT navigational radar operating on the X and S-bands.

Service history
The ship was ordered from Irving Shipbuilding in 2009 and the ship's keel was laid down at Halifax Shipyards in Halifax, Nova Scotia with the yard number 6096. Launched in 2013, the ship was completed in February of that year and entered service with the Canadian Coast Guard. The ship was named for Robert Gordon Teather, a Royal Canadian Mounted Police corporal who was awarded the Cross of Valour for his actions during a water rescue in 1981. In February 2017, Corporal Teather C.V. was among the Canadian Coast Guard ships named in a report claiming poisoned water aboard some vessels.

References

Sources
 

Hero-class patrol vessels
2012 ships
Ships of the Canadian Coast Guard
Patrol vessels of the Canadian Coast Guard